Sabrina Inés Ameghino (born July 6, 1980) is an Argentinian sprint canoeist. She competed at the 2016 Summer Olympics in the women's K-1 200 metres race, in which she reached the semifinals, and as part of the 13th-place Argentina team in the women's K-4 500 metres race.

In 2019 Panamerican Games celebrated in Lima, Perú, Sabrina won two more medals, including a gold one in Women's K-1 200 metres category. 
This way, Sabrina becomes the first Argentinean canoeing woman in history with a gold medal within panamerican games.

References

1980 births
Living people
Argentine female canoeists
Olympic canoeists of Argentina
Canoeists at the 2016 Summer Olympics
Pan American Games medalists in canoeing
Pan American Games silver medalists for Argentina
Pan American Games bronze medalists for Argentina
Canoeists at the 2015 Pan American Games
Canoeists at the 2019 Pan American Games
Medalists at the 2015 Pan American Games
Medalists at the 2019 Pan American Games